Grand Central Hotel may refer to:

Grand Central Hotel, a demolished New York City hotel
 Grand Central Hotel, Adelaide, demolished building in Pulteney Street, Adelaide, South Australia
Grand Central Hotel Belfast, a partly demolished former hotel and military base
Grand Central Hotel (Glasgow), a functioning hotel formerly called Central Hotel
Grand Central Hotel (Las Vegas), a proposed hotel
Grand Central Hotel (Omaha, Nebraska), a demolished hotel destroyed by fire
Grand Central Hotel (Perth), a hotel and YWCA building

See also
Grand Central (disambiguation)